Heversham is a small village and civil parish in the South Lakeland district of Cumbria, England. In the 2001 census the parish had a population of 647, increasing at the 2011 census to 699.

It is situated above the marshes of the Kent estuary which gives some fine views, notably from Heversham Head where there is a toposcope.

It has a variety of recreational facilities, including a fully functioning outdoor activities centre, tennis courts, bowling green and a playground.  There are also rugby, football and hockey fields, as well as a cricket ground and pavilion.

History
Heversham had an abbey in the early Anglo-Saxon period. According to the Historia de Sancto Cuthberto, in the early tenth century its abbot, who was called Tilred, purchased the village of Castle Eden and gave half of it to Norham abbey so that he could be abbot there, perhaps because Heversham Abbey had been destroyed by the Vikings. Part of a carved stone cross still survives. It was found under the lych-gate of St Peter's Church, which may indicate that the monastery was located nearby.

Transport

Rail
It was on the Hincaster branch railway line from 26 June 1876.  Passenger services ended on the branch on 4 May 1942.

Road
Heversham is situated just off the A6. It formerly straddled the A6, but the centre of the village was bypassed in the 1920s.  However, the Stagecoach bus route 555 still passes through the centre.

The new section of road was opened by the future Edward VIII and was named Prince's Way.
The Heversham Hotel, referred to by the locals as the "Blue Bell", is on this bypass.

Schools
Heversham Grammar School existed for more than 370 years from 1613 until 1984, when it amalgamated with the comprehensive school in Milnthorpe to become the boarding house and 6th form college of Dallam School. 
The boarding and outdoors section of Dallam School are situated in Heversham and the outdoors centre is open to the public.

The local primary school, Heversham St Peters, was closed in 2017. It used to be next to the church but was moved to Leasgill due to the fact that the toilets were right above the village water supply.

Famous people
 Geoffrey Bibby, archaeologist

See also

Listed buildings in Heversham

References

External links

 Heversham Parish Council
  Cumbria County History Trust: Heversham (nb: provisional research only - see Talk page)
 http://www.heversham.org/heversham_history_bingham_1.html
 http://www.railscot.co.uk/Hincaster_Branch/frame.htm
 http://www.dallam.eu
 http://www.dallam.eu/outdoors

 
Villages in Cumbria
Civil parishes in Cumbria
South Lakeland District